The 2023 Swedish Golf Tour, titled as the 2023 MoreGolf Mastercard Tour for sponsorship reasons, is the 40th season of the Swedish Golf Tour, a series of professional golf tournaments held in Sweden and Norway with a winter series in Spain.

All tournaments also featured on the 2023 Nordic Golf League.

Schedule
The following table lists official events during the 2023 season.

See also
2023 Danish Golf Tour
2023 Finnish Tour
2023 Swedish Golf Tour (women)

Notes

References

Swedish Golf Tour
Swedish Golf Tour
Swedish Golf Tour